Meteor City was a historic trading post located on historic Route 66 west of the town of Unincorporated Winslow situated in Coconino County, Arizona. Accessing it from interstate 40 (I-40), you would exit at Mile-marker / Exit 239 (Meteor City Road) coming from the east or west.

Despite the name, Meteor City was never the name of a town, but rather, it was a trading post. The Meteor City Trading Post, named in honor of the nearby Meteor or Barringer Crater, is the first of three Route 66-inspired roadside attractions located only a few miles apart along a 30-mile stretch west on Interstate 40 from Winslow to Flagstaff: Meteor City; the ghost town of Two Guns and the ruins of the Twin Arrows Trading Post / Diner and Gas Station, which now marks the turnoff for the new Twin Arrows Navajo Casino Resort.

Meteor City was first opened in 1938 and was operated as the Sharber Service Station, under the Texaco brand, by Arizona resident Joe Sharber.

In 1941, an expansion of the property by a new owner, Iowan Jack Newsum, nicknamed “Lonesome Jack,” included the addition of a trading post where visitors could buy gas, groceries and curios. At one time the sign upon entering the area once read, "Population: 1" and later "Population 2" when the service station's proprietor Joseph Sharber married Gloria. A geodesic dome, complete with a bright yellow faux Mohawk, was built in 1979 after the original building burnt down in the 1960s to house the curio shop which was stocked with a variety of items, including moccasins, postcards and Baja shirts.

In March 2017, Mike and Joann Brown purchased Meteor City and are currently working to restore the dome, as well as the surrounding buildings and property .

Two former 'quirky' tourist attractions on the Meteor City property were billed as the “World’s Longest Map of Route 66,” painted by American artist and cartographer Bob Waldmire, and the “World’s Largest Dream-catcher,” located out near the road in front of the dome. There are also five 'tee-pees' on the property.

The exterior wood fence the map was on has fallen down and has been placed into storage and the tattered dream-catcher will be repaired.

The Browns also hope to restore the original Justice of the Peace building located just west of the dome. Infamous as “the wicked witch of Route 66,” Newsum's wife, Goldie, serving as justice, issued speeding citations to unwary drivers on Route 66.

They plan to soft open the dome to visitors fall/winter 2020 while focusing on the 'city' aspect of Meteor City.

See also
 Route 66

References

External links
 Meteor City on Facebook
 Meteor City on Instagram
 Route 66 World by Ed Klein
 Winslow AZ
 Never Quite Lost: Meteor City - Population 2

Tourist attractions in Coconino County, Arizona